The 2011 European Tour was the third edition of the Race to Dubai and the 40th season of golf tournaments since the European Tour officially began in 1972. 

The season began in December 2010 with the Alfred Dunhill Championship in South Africa, and culminated with the Dubai World Championship the following December. The full schedule included the four major championships and four World Golf Championships.

The Race to Dubai was won by Englishman Luke Donald, who also collected the Golfer of the Year award having also headed the PGA Tour money list and ascended to the top of the Official World Golf Ranking during 2011. Compatriot Tom Lewis was Sir Henry Cotton Rookie of the Year.

Schedule
The following table lists official events during the 2011 season.

Unofficial events
The following events were sanctioned by the European Tour, but did not carry official money, nor were wins official.

Location of tournaments

Race to Dubai
Since 2009, the European Tour's money list has been known as the "Race to Dubai". It is based on money earned during the season and is calculated in euro, with earnings from tournaments that award prize money in other currencies being converted at the exchange rate available the week of the event.

Final standings
Final top 15 players in the Race to Dubai:

• Did not play

Awards

Golfer of the Month

See also
2011 in golf
2011 Challenge Tour
2011 European Senior Tour
2011 PGA Tour
List of golfers with most European Tour wins

Notes

References

External links
2011 season results on the PGA European Tour website
2011 Order of Merit on the PGA European Tour website

European Tour seasons
European Tour